The first inauguration of Dwight D. Eisenhower as the 34th president of the United States was held on Tuesday, January 20, 1953, at the East Portico of the United States Capitol in Washington, D.C. This was the 42nd inauguration and marked the commencement of the first term of Dwight D. Eisenhower as president and of Richard Nixon as vice president. Chief Justice Fred M. Vinson administered the presidential oath of office to Eisenhower. The vice presidential oath was administered to Nixon by Senator William Knowland.

During the Oath, Eisenhower said the line "the office of President of the United States" as "the office of the President of the United States," even as chief justice Vinson said the line correctly.

Eisenhower placed his hand on two Bibles when he recited the oath: the Bible used by George Washington in 1789, opened to II Chronicles 7:14; and his own personal "West Point Bible," opened to Psalm 33:12. Afterward, he recited his own prayer at the start of his inaugural address, rather than kissing the Bible.  George H. W. Bush would also compose his own prayer to recite during his inaugural speech in 1989.

Inaugural committee
The 1953 United States Congress Joint Committee on Inaugural Ceremonies, the group responsible for the planning and execution of the Inauguration, was composed of:
Senator Styles Bridges (R-NH), Chairman
Senator Carl T. Hayden (D-AZ)
Representative Leslie C. Arends (R-IL)
Representative Joseph W. Martin (R-MA)
Representative Sam Rayburn (D-TX)

See also
1952 United States presidential election
Presidency of Dwight D. Eisenhower
Second inauguration of Dwight D. Eisenhower

References

External links

  (with audio)
 
 
 
 
 
 
 
 
 
 
 
 Text of Eisenhower's First Inaugural Address
 Audio of Eisenhower's First Inaugural Address

1953 in Washington, D.C.
1953 in American politics
Inauguration 1953
United States presidential inaugurations
January 1953 events in the United States